The Hathamati River  is a river of western India, in Gujarat, whose origin is in the Aravali Range hills. It is one of the left-bank tributaries of the Sabarmati River. The Hathmati river system includes the Hathamati Dam near Himatnagar. The Guhai River is a tributary of the Hathmati River.

Bhiloda and Himatnagar are the main towns on the banks of this river.

In fiscal year 1899-1900, a channel was cut from the Hathmati Canal to the Khari River to capture rainy season overflow for irrigation from the Khari Cut.

References

Rivers of Gujarat
Rivers of India
Sabarmati River